Frederick Charles Beiser (born November 27, 1949) is an American philosopher who is professor of philosophy at Syracuse University. He is one of the leading English-language scholars of German idealism. In addition to his writings on German idealism, Beiser has also written on the German Romantics and 19th-century British philosophy. He received a Guggenheim Fellowship for his research in 1994, and was awarded the Order of Merit of the Federal Republic of Germany in 2015.

Early life and education
Beiser was born on November 27, 1949, in Pittsburgh, Pennsylvania. In 1971, Beiser received a bachelor's degree from Shimer College, a Great Books college then located in Mount Carroll, Illinois. He then studied at the Oriel College of the University of Oxford, where he received a Bachelor of Arts degree in philosophy, politics and economics in 1974. He subsequently studied at the London School of Economics and Political Science from 1974 to 1975. Beiser earned his Doctor of Philosophy (DPhil) degree in philosophy from Wolfson College, Oxford, in 1980, under the direction of Charles Taylor and Isaiah Berlin. His doctoral thesis was titled The Spirit of the Phenomenology: Hegel's Resurrection of Metaphysics in the Phänomenologie des Geistes.

Career

After receiving his DPhil in 1980, Beiser moved to West Germany, where he was a Thyssen Research Fellow at the Free University of Berlin. He returned to the United States four years later. He joined the University of Pennsylvania's faculty in 1984, staying there until 1985. He then spent the springs of 1986 and 1987 at the University of Wisconsin–Madison and University of Colorado Boulder, respectively.

In 1987, Beiser released his first book, The Fate of Reason: German Philosophy from Kant to Fichte (Harvard University Press). In the book, Beiser sought to reconstruct the background of German idealism through the narration of the story of the Spinoza or Pantheism controversy. Consequently, a great many figures, whose importance was hardly recognized by the English-speaking philosophers, were given their proper due. The work won the Thomas J. Wilson Memorial Prize for best first book. He has since edited two Cambridge anthologies on Hegel, The Cambridge Companion to Hegel (1993) and The Cambridge Companion to Hegel and Nineteenth-Century Philosophy (2008), and written a number of books on German philosophy and the English Enlightenment. He also edited The Early Political Writings of the German Romantics (Cambridge University Press) in 1996.

In 1988, Beiser moved again to West Germany, where he was a Humboldt Research Fellow at the Free University of Berlin. He returned to the United States in 1990 to take up a professorship at Indiana University Bloomington, where he remained until 2001. During his tenure at Indiana, he spent time teaching at Yale University. He joined Syracuse University in 2001, where he remains as of 2017. He also taught at Harvard University during the spring of 2002.

Beiser is notable amongst English-language scholars for his defense of the metaphysical aspects of German idealism (e.g. Naturphilosophie), both in their centrality to any historical understanding of German idealism, as well as their continued relevance to contemporary philosophy.

Works

Monographs 
 
 
 
 
 
 
 
 
 
 
 
 
 
 Hermann Cohen: An Intellectual Biography. Oxford University Press. 2018.
 David Friedrich Strauß, Father of Unbelief: An Intellectual Biography.  Oxford University Press. 2020.
 Johann Friedrich Herbart: Grandfather of Analytic Philosophy.  Oxford University Press. 2022

Edited works

References

External links
Faculty page at Syracuse University 
"Diotima's Child", an interview in 3:16 Magazine, first published 2012-09-21.

1949 births
Living people
Alumni of the University of Oxford
Alumni of the London School of Economics
American expatriates in Germany
Harvard University faculty
Indiana University faculty
Philosophers from Colorado
Philosophers from Connecticut
Philosophers from Indiana
Philosophers from Massachusetts
Shimer College alumni
Syracuse University faculty
University of Colorado faculty
Yale University faculty
Recipients of the Order of Merit of the Federal Republic of Germany